Bitheridus was a chieftain of the Bucinobantes, an Alemannic tribe. In 372, along with his kinsman Hortarius, Bitheridus served as a troop leader in the Roman army under Valentinian I.

Sources

4th-century Germanic people
Alemannic rulers
Alemannic warriors
Ancient Roman military personnel